The Leuven Vulgate or Hentenian Bible is an edition of the Vulgate which was edited by Hentenius (1499–1566) and published in Louvain in 1547. This edition was republished several times, and in 1574 a revised edition was published.

The 1583 edition of the Leuven Vulgate is cited in the Oxford Vulgate New Testament, where it is designated by the siglum  (H for Hentenian).

History

Publications 
On 8 April 1546, at the Council of Trent, a decision was made to prepare an authorized version of the Vulgate. No direct action was taken for the next forty years, and many scholars continued to publish their own editions. Among these editions, the edition prepared by Hentenius served almost as the standard text of the Catholic Church.

The first edition of Hentenius was entitled Biblia ad vetustissima exemplaria nunc recens castigata and was published by the printer  in November 1547. Hentenius used 30 Vulgate manuscripts to make his edition. Hentenius' edition is similar to the 1532 and 1540 editions of the Vulgate produced by Robert Estienne.

Lucas Brugensis editions 
After the death of Hentenius in 1566, Franciscus Lucas Brugensis continued his critical work and prepared his own edition; the edition was published in 1574 in Antwerp by Plantin, under the title: Biblia Sacra: Qui in hac editione, a Theologis Lovanienibus prestitum sit, paulo post indicatur. This revision has the same text as the original edition. However the punctuation was modified, and supplementary variants were added in the margin; few variants from the original edition were removed.

In 1583, a new edition of the Leuven Vulgate was published by the Plantin Press. This edition was a reprint of the 1574 edition with as a supplement in appendix a critical apparatus made by Lucas Brugensis: his Notationes in sacra Biblia previously published independently in 1580. This edition was published under the title: Biblia Sacra, quid in hac editione a theologis Lovaniensibus praestitum sit, eorum praefatio indicat.

Importance 
The 1583 edition of the Leuven Vulgate served as the basis for the elaboration of the Sixtine and Clementine editions of the Vulgate.

Using the Leuven Vulgate as basis, Nicolaus van Winghe  (1548), and Nicolas de Leuze  (1550). Both translations were published in Leuven. Jakub Wujek based his translation, the Wujek Bible, on the 1574 edition of the Leuven Vulgate.

Notes

References

Bibliography

External links 
1547 edition

 (click on "metadati", if the image does not load)

1574 edition

1583 edition

Miscellaneous
 Leuven Vulgate from 1574, Antique Holy Bible
http://www.bibliasacra.nl/

Editions of the Vulgate
1547 books
16th-century Latin books